Inspirit is the first single album of South Korean boy band Infinite. The album was released on March 17, 2011, along with the music video for the album's lead single "Nothing's Over". Infinite followed up the promotions of "Nothing's Over" with a broadcasting version of their song "Can U Smile (Remake)".

Track listing

The song "Can U Smile (Remake)" is a new version of the song with the same title, originally released on their previous EP Evolution.

Chart

Sales

References

External links
 

2011 albums
Infinite (group) albums
Korean-language albums
Single albums